Føyno is an island in Stord municipality in Vestland county, Norway.  The  island lies southwest of the island of Stord at the southern end of the Stokksundet sound.  The Digernessundet strait runs between Stord and this island.  Føyno had a central place in the district of Sunnhordland during the Middle Ages, and gave its name to the skipreide of Føyen.

Transportation
The island had no road connections to anywhere prior to December 2000 when the Triangle Link was opened.  Føyno became a central piece of the bridge-tunnel connection connecting the municipalities of Stord and Bømlo to the mainland of Sveio to the south.  The Bømlafjord tunnel heads south from Føyno to Sveio and the Stord Bridge goes north to the island of Stord.  A short bridge from Føyno to the neighboring island of Nautøy to the east connects with the large Bømla Bridge which finally connects to Bømlo. The island became a central part of the European route E39 highway in Western Norway as part of the Triangle Link. The toll station for this link is located on Føyno.

See also
List of islands of Norway

References

Islands of Vestland
Stord